A wing is a type of fin that produces lift while moving through air or some other fluid. Accordingly, wings have streamlined cross-sections that are subject to aerodynamic forces and act as airfoils. A wing's aerodynamic efficiency is expressed as its lift-to-drag ratio. The lift a wing generates at a given speed and angle of attack can be one to two orders of magnitude greater than the total drag on the wing. A high lift-to-drag ratio requires a significantly smaller thrust to propel the wings through the air at sufficient lift.

Lifting structures used in water include various foils, such as hydrofoils. Hydrodynamics is the governing science, rather than aerodynamics. Applications of underwater foils occur in hydroplanes, sailboats and submarines.

Etymology and usage
For many centuries, the word "wing", from the Old Norse vængr, referred mainly to the foremost limbs of birds (in addition to the architectural aisle). But in recent centuries the word's meaning has extended to include lift producing appendages of insects, bats, pterosaurs, boomerangs, some sail boats and aircraft, or the inverted airfoil on a race car that generates a downward force to increase traction.

Aerodynamics

The design and analysis of the wings of aircraft is one of the principal applications of the science of aerodynamics, which is a branch of fluid mechanics. In principle, the properties of the airflow around any moving object can be found by solving the Navier-Stokes equations of fluid dynamics. However, except for simple geometries these equations are notoriously difficult to solve and simpler equations are used.

For a wing to produce lift, it must be oriented at a suitable angle of attack. When this occurs, the wing deflects the airflow downwards as it passes the wing. Since the wing exerts a force on the air to change its direction, the air must also exert an equal and opposite force on the wing.

Cross-sectional shape 
An airfoil (American English) or aerofoil (British English) is the shape of a wing, blade (of a propeller, rotor, or turbine), or sail (as seen in cross-section). Wings with an asymmetrical cross section are the norm in subsonic flight. Wings with a symmetrical cross section can also generate lift by using a positive angle of attack to deflect air downward. Symmetrical airfoils have higher stalling speeds than cambered airfoils of the same wing area but are used in aerobatic aircraft as they provide practical performance whether the aircraft is upright or inverted. Another example comes from sailboats, where the sail is a thin membrane with no path-length difference between one side and the other.

For flight speeds near the speed of sound (transonic flight), airfoils with complex asymmetrical shapes are used to minimize the drastic increase in drag associated with airflow near the speed of sound. Such airfoils, called supercritical airfoils, are flat on top and curved on the bottom.

Design features 

Aircraft wings may feature some of the following:
 A rounded leading edge cross-section
 A sharp trailing edge cross-section
 Leading-edge devices such as slats, slots, or extensions
 Trailing-edge devices such as flaps or flaperons (combination of flaps and ailerons)
 Winglets to keep wingtip vortices from increasing drag and decreasing lift
 Dihedral, or a positive wing angle to the horizontal, increases spiral stability around the roll axis, whereas anhedral, or a negative wing angle to the horizontal, decreases spiral stability.

Aircraft wings may have various devices, such as flaps or slats that the pilot uses to modify the shape and surface area of the wing to change its operating characteristics in flight.
 Ailerons (usually near the wingtips) to roll the aircraft clockwise or counterclockwise about its long axis
 Spoilers on the upper surface to disrupt the lift and to provide additional traction to an aircraft that has just landed but is still moving.
 Vortex generators mitigate flow separation at low speeds and high angles of attack, especially over control surfaces.
 Wing fences to keep flow attached to the wing by stopping boundary layer separation from spreading roll direction. 
 Folding wings allow more aircraft storage in the confined space of the hangar deck of an aircraft carrier
 Variable-sweep wing or "swing wings" that allow outstretched wings during low-speed flight (i.e., take-off and landing) and swept back wings for high-speed flight (including supersonic flight), such as in the F-111 Aardvark, the F-14 Tomcat, the Panavia Tornado, the MiG-23, the MiG-27, the Tu-160 and the B-1B Lancer warplanes
 Strakes to improve flight characteristics
 Chine, which may blend into the wing
 Leading-edge droop flap, a high-lift device
 Fairings, structures whose primary function is to produce a smooth outline and reduce drag. For example, flap track fairings

Wings may have other minor independent surfaces.

Applications and variants 

Besides fixed-wing aircraft, applications for wing shapes include:
 Hang gliders, which use wings ranging from fully flexible (paragliders, gliding parachutes), flexible (framed sail wings), to rigid
 Kites, which use a variety of surfaces to attain lift and maintain stability
 Flying model airplanes
 Helicopters, which use a rotating wing with a variable pitch angle to provide directional forces
 Propellers, whose blades generate lift for propulsion.
 The NASA Space Shuttle, which uses its wings only to glide during its descent to a runway. These types of aircraft are called spaceplanes.
 Some racing cars, especially Formula One cars, which use upside-down wings (or airfoils) to provide greater traction at high speeds.
 Sailboats, which use flexible cloth sails as vertical wings with variable fullness and direction to move across water.
 Hydrofoils, which use rigid wing shaped structures to lift a vessel out of the water to reduce drag and increase speed.

In nature 

In nature, wings have evolved in insects, pterosaurs, dinosaurs (birds), and mammals (bats) as a means of locomotion. Various species of penguins and other flighted or flightless water birds such as auks, cormorants, guillemots, shearwaters, eider and scoter ducks and diving petrels are avid swimmers, and use their wings to propel through water.
Wing forms in nature

Tensile structures
In 1948, Francis Rogallo invented a kite-like tensile wing supported by inflated or rigid struts, which ushered in new possibilities for aircraft. Near in time, Domina Jalbert invented flexible un-sparred ram-air airfoiled thick wings. These two new branches of wings have been since extensively studied and applied in new branches of aircraft, especially altering the personal recreational aviation landscape.

See also 
 Flight
Natural world:
 Bat flight
 Bird flight
 Flight feather
 Flying and gliding animals
 Insect flight
 List of soaring birds
 Samara (winged seeds of trees)
Aviation:
 Aircraft
 Blade solidity
 FanWing and Flettner airplane (experimental wing types)
 Flight dynamics (fixed-wing aircraft)
 Kite types
 Ornithopter – Flapping-wing aircraft (research prototypes, simple toys and models)
 Otto Lilienthal
 Wing configuration
 Wing root
 Wingsuit flying
Sailing:
 Sails
 Forces on sails
 Wingsail

References

External links 

How Wings Work - Holger Babinsky Physics Education 2003

How Airplanes Fly: A Physical Description of Lift
Demystifying the Science of Flight – Audio segment on NPR's Talk of the Nation Science Friday
NASA's explanations and simulations

Flight of the StyroHawk wing
See How It Flies

Aerodynamics
Aerospace technologies
Aircraft wing components
Bird anatomy
Bird flight
Insect anatomy
Mammal anatomy

es:Ala (zoología)